With Monti for Italy  was an electoral coalition of political parties in Italy, formed for the 2013 general election to support the outgoing Prime Minister Mario Monti and his reform plans. Its platform was based on Monti's manifesto titled "Change Italy. Reform Europe."

Formation and composition
The coalition was launched in December 2012 during the last month of the Monti Cabinet. It comprised the following parties:

While the UdC and FLI were established parties, SC was formed in the run-up of the election by Monti. Its core consisted of Toward the Third Republic (VTR), a centrist outfit formed in November 2012 by the merger of Luca Cordero di Montezemolo's Future Italy (IF) with other centrist associations as Toward North (VN), established parties such as Lorenzo Dellai's Union for Trentino (UpT), and some leading figures from progressive Catholic ecclesial movements and trade associations, notably including minister Andrea Riccardi of the Community of Sant'Egidio, Andrea Olivero of the Christian Associations of Italian Workers (ACLI) and Luigi Marino of Confcooperative. Beyond Riccardi, also ministers Renato Balduzzi and Enzo Moavero Milanesi joined SC. Moreover, a number of individual representatives of the centre-left Democratic Party (PD) and centre-right The People of Freedom (PdL) announced their defections to Monti's party. The partyless economist Monti presented the grouping as a civil movement and rejected the traditional notions of political left, right, or centre.

Because of the particularities of Italy's electoral law, the coalition ran as an alliance of three constituent lists for the Chamber of Deputies (SC, UdC and FLI) and as a single list for the Senate. Monti has chosen business executive Enrico Bondi to assist him with examining the coalition's candidates.

Electoral results

Italian Parliament

Symbols

References

Defunct political party alliances in Italy